Adolph or Adolph of Nassau-Weilburg may refer to:

Adolf, King of Germany (c. 1255–1298), King of the Romans
Adolphe, Grand Duke of Luxembourg (1817–1905), last sovereign Duke of Nassau

See also
 Adolf of Nassau (disambiguation)
Adolf (disambiguation)
Nassau (disambiguation)